61 Aquarii is a binary star system located around 410 light years away from the Sun in the equatorial constellation of Aquarius. 51 Aquarii is its Flamsteed designation. It is visible to the naked eye as a dim, yellow-white hued star with a combined apparent visual magnitude of 5.78. The system is moving further from the Earth with a heliocentric radial velocity of +6 km/s.

The dual nature of this system was discovered by S. W. Burnham in 1873
with a  Alvan Clark refractor. The pair orbit each other with a period of 145 years and a large eccentricity of 0.7. The magnitude 6.45 primary, designated component A, is an A-type main sequence star with a stellar classification of A0 V. It has a high rate of rotation with a projected rotational velocity of 91 km/s. The secondary component has a matching class of A0 with a visual magnitude of 6.63. It has an effective temperature of 10,238 K.

References

External links
 Image 51 Aquarii

A-type main-sequence stars
Binary stars
Aquarius (constellation)
Durchmusterung objects
Aquarii, 051
212404
110578
8533